Scott Gardner Shriner (born July 11, 1965) is an American musician best known as a member of the rock band Weezer, with whom he has recorded twelve studio albums. Joining the band in 2001, Shriner is the band's longest serving bass guitarist.

Prior to his musical career, Shriner was a member of the Marine Corps. At the age of twenty-five, he moved to Los Angeles, California to pursue a career in music, attending the Musicians Institute. Shriner subsequently performed with multiple independent acts, and toured as a member of Vanilla Ice's backing band, in support of the rapper's nu metal album Hard to Swallow.

In 2001, Shriner joined Weezer on a provisional basis, following the sudden departure of bass guitarist Mikey Welsh, who had left the band due to personal reasons. Upon becoming Welsh's full-time replacement, Shriner made his recording debut on the band's fourth studio album, Maladroit (2002). During the band's tour in support of its fifth studio album, Make Believe (2005), Weezer frontman Rivers Cuomo would at times relinquish his role as lead vocalist to allow Shriner, and his bandmates, Brian Bell and Patrick Wilson, to sing lead vocals on specific songs. This increased vocal responsibility carried over to the band's 2008 self-titled release (aka the "Red Album"), where Shriner co-wrote and sang lead vocals on "Cold Dark World" and performed lead vocals on "King".

Shriner also performed in his bandmate Patrick Wilson's side-project The Special Goodness for some time.

Early life
Shriner was born in Toledo, Ohio. He took up bass in high school. After being discharged from the Marine Corps, he found his high school bass teacher Mark Kieswetter, with whom he studied until moving to Los Angeles in 1989. While in Toledo, Shriner and his best friend Rob Weaver started a band called The Seventh Wave with former Newles members Bob Schramm and Bill Whitman. Shriner went on to play with several Toledo bands, namely The Movers, The Fever, The Theresa Harris Band, and Loved by Millions. He then finished his Toledo music experience with Tim Gahagen, Matt Donahue and Brad Coffin in a band called "The Great Barbeque Gods".

Shriner moved to Los Angeles, California at the age of 25 to attend Musicians Institute and went on to play in several bands including Broken, Bomber, Black Elvis, Mystery Train, Electric Love Hogs, Crown and, most notably, Vanilla Ice's backing band, in support of the rapper's nu metal album Hard to Swallow.

Weezer
In the summer of 2001, Shriner joined Weezer on a provisional basis. Following the departure of their second bassist, Mikey Welsh (who left the band due to personal problems), Shriner was made their full-time bassist. In his first show with Weezer, the 2001 KROQ-FM Inland Invasion, he was attacked by a man later found out to be a friend of his, yet continued to play on as security guards pried the guy off his back.

Initially it was made clear to Shriner that he was not going to be a member of the band and was just filling in until Welsh returned. It was only during the photo shoot for the Maladroit album artwork that Shriner realized that he was officially a member of Weezer, having previously only been told to show up for gigs and recording. Shriner is now Weezer's third bassist, and the longest-running bassist in Weezer history; he has appeared on twelve of Weezer's fifteen studio albums.

On Weezer's third self-titled album, he co-wrote and sang lead vocals on "Cold Dark World," sang lead vocals on "King" (a deluxe edition track), and sang most of the lead vocals for the band's covers of "The Weight" by The Band and "Oddfellows Local 151" by R.E.M.

In 2005, he sang lead vocals on Weezer songs "In the Garage," "Dope Nose," and "Fall Together." In 2008, during the band's Hootenanny Tour, he sang lead vocals on a cover of "Creep" by Radiohead. On the band's 2008 Troublemaker Tour, he sang "Perfect Situation" and "My Name is Jonas," which he sings in a three-way lead vocal second, with Patrick Wilson and Rivers Cuomo singing lead vocals first and last respectively. He also played on the band's EP The Lion and the Witch and numerous b-sides and demos that can be found on the internet. He has also played shows with Patrick Wilson's band The Special Goodness.

On April 11, 2018, several days prior to the Cars' performance at their Rock and Roll Hall of Fame induction on April 14, Shriner announced that he would perform with the band. Shriner had previously worked with Cars leader Ric Ocasek when the latter produced the 2014 Weezer album Everything Will Be Alright in the End.

In 2020, Shriner voiced himself in The Simpsons episode "The Hateful Eight-Year-Olds", along with the rest of Weezer.

Equipment
Shriner's primary bass guitars are his 1960 and 1962 Fender Precision Bass guitars, and an Electrical Guitar Company Custom Bass; he can also be seen playing Lakland and Warwick Thumb, and more recently, a Rickenbacker bass. His rig setup consists of an early 70's Ampeg SVT Head and Mesa Boogie 8x10 and 4x12 cabinets. For distortion, Scott uses an Electro-Harmonix bass big muff pi. Scott also uses Shure in-ear monitors.

Personal life
On November 9, 2005, Shriner married Jillian Lauren, author and former member of the harem of Prince Jefri Bolkiah of Brunei, in Hawaii. The couple have two adopted children. They have two dogs, Peanut and Calvin, both of whom appeared in a PETA video encouraging people to adopt from shelters.

He guest-starred with the band The Scrantones at the 2007 The Office convention. During this performance, the band played Radiohead's "Creep" with The Office's Craig Robinson on vocals.

In June 2009, Scott guest-starred with E.J. Wells in a music video of Wells' "There's Something In The Graveyard," which is the first music video ever filmed in the historic Virginia City Cemetery, in Virginia City, Nevada.

He is a fan of Elvis Costello, The Beatles, Led Zeppelin, and Black Sabbath. During the Q&A aboard The Weezer Cruise 2012, Scott admitted that Elton John was a big influence during his childhood.

Discography

With Weezer

 Maladroit (2002)
 The Lion and the Witch EP (2002)
 Make Believe (2005)
 The Red Album (2008)
 Raditude (2009)
 Hurley (2010)
 Death to False Metal (2010)
 Everything Will Be Alright in the End (2014)
 The White Album (2016)
 Pacific Daydream (2017)
 The Teal Album (2019)
 The Black Album (2019)
 OK Human (2021)
 Van Weezer (2021)
 SZNZ: Spring (2022)
 SZNZ: Summer (2022)
 SZNZ: Autumn (2022)
 SZNZ: Winter (2022)

Other appearances
 Anthony Green's solo debut Avalon (2008)

References

External links
 Scott Shriner biography at Weezernet.com
 Scott Shriner fan interview at Weerez.com

1965 births
American rock bass guitarists
American male bass guitarists
Living people
Guitarists from Ohio
Musicians from Toledo, Ohio
United States Marines
Weezer members
Musicians Institute alumni
Power pop musicians
The Special Goodness members
20th-century American guitarists